Padeh or Pedeh may refer to:

Afghanistan
 Padeh-ye Nowkdari
 Padeh-ye Laghari

Iran
 Pedeh, Arzuiyeh, Kerman Province
 Padeh, Kohgiluyeh and Boyer-Ahmad